The Nyuntam Aay Yojana (abbr. Nyay; a Hindi word meaning "justice") was a proposed social welfare programme by the Indian National Congress in its 2019 general election manifesto. It promised that the party, if voted to power in the 2019 Indian general election, would enact a law under which it would distribute cash to the bottom 20 per cent of India's families in terms of wealth, as a minimum guarantee programme. These households would each receive up to  a year, a program the Congress claimed would benefit 250 million people in India.

In May 2020, a reworked version of the Nyuntam Aay Yojana, named as the Rajiv Gandhi Kisan Nyay Yojana (RGKNY) in honour of former Indian Prime Minister Rajiv Gandhi, was announced. Under the scheme, up to Rs 10,000 per acre a year will be transferred into the bank accounts of farmers; the first instalment totalling Rs 1,500 crore was transferred by Chief Minister of Chhattisgarh Bhupesh Baghel to nearly two million farmers during the launch.

Background 
The Nyuntam Aay Yojana was proposed as part of the Indian National Congress campaign for the 2019 Indian general election, which primarily focused on agrarian distress while the Bharatiya Janata Party campaign for the 2019 Indian general election focused on infrastructural development and anti-immigration policies. The program was announced on 3 March 2019, at the manifesto's release event at the All India Congress Committee's headquarters at New Delhi.

The scheme was backed by Rahul Gandhi, then-president of the INC, who stated that "the Nyantam Aay Yojana is "an extremely powerful, extremely dynamic, extremely well-thought-through idea"", claiming that it is supported by "the best economists"". According to Bhalchandra Mungekar – a former member of India's Planning Commission and a member of Congress party's manifesto committee, the scheme would redistribute about  a year. Mungekar stated that the Indian GDP in 2018 was $2.67 trillion, and the promised welfare program of the Congress party, if enacted and implemented, would collect and redistribute 1.9 percent of India's Gross Domestic Product to the poor. He states that the welfare program would be an affordable and just redistribution of national income. According to P Chidambaram – former Finance Minister of India, the proposed welfare program "will not affect other welfare program subsidies India already operates, will constitute 1.8 percent of India's GDP, and benefit 50 million families".

Criticism 
The Nyuntam Aay Yojana has been criticised by newspapers, politicians and economists on grounds of impracticality and the large expenses of maintaining such a scheme.

According to The Economic Times, the Nyantam Aay Yojana is yet another welfare programme for India, but one that is 'between promising the moon and simply loony'. It will lead to fiscal ruin if existing welfare programmes and food, fuel and other subsidies operate in parallel to the Nyantam Aay Yojana. To pay for the new welfare programme and maintain India's current deficit level, the Congress party will need to raise GST rate, income taxes and wealth tax. Since the proposed welfare programme would be a cash redistribution without any link to work or jobs, it will create no new jobs and worsen the recent productivity growth India has witnessed". The UK-based weekly The Economist stated that "India already has "over 950 centrally-funded schemes and subsidies", but the benefits of these welfare programmes never reach the poor because it typically lands up in the government officials' pockets and those of the wealthier sections of society who are politically and bureaucratically well connected. Welfare programmes that "prevent participants from doing any other work" are problematic. Another major flaw in Nyuntam Aay Yojana, stated by The Economist is its assumption that the government officials will be able to identify the poor. Given the incentive of government income for being within the poorest 20%, people will likely compete to be poor or appear to be poor so as to avail the benefits".

According to Raghuram Rajan – the former governor of Reserve Bank of India, the Nyuntam Aay Yojana was "good in theory but needs to take into account the fiscal realities of India". The programme details and "how it will roll out" are unclear, states Rajan, and such a programme if implemented properly at the grassroots level can revolutionise things, but "given where we [Indian government fiscal deficits] are, can we add another 7 lakh crore subsidy? The answer is no." Any Direct Bank Transfer scheme, such as the Nyuntam Aay Yojana should aim to alleviate poverty, but to be effective they should bring "more people into productive work force" and they "should not discourage work". James Crabtree – a professor of Public Policy Practice and the former Mumbai Bureau chief of The Financial Times, states that the Nyuntam Aay Yojana idea is not supported by the "best economists" contrary to Rahul Gandhi's beliefs. The idea is a copy of Universal Basic Income idea that is currently fashionable among left-wing advocacy groups worldwide and is innovative compared to past proposals of the Congress party. However, it is unworkable, states Crabtree, in part because it is politically infeasible as it promises to discriminate between the poor by targeting the lowest 20% when similar impoverishment affects far more Indian families. Even if Nyuntam Aay Yojana can politically ignore the impoverished families above the bottom 20%, it is fiscally unaffordable because it would cost about 2% of India's gross domestic product, according to Jamestree. The Nyuntam Aay Yojana cannot end poverty in India, predicted Jamestree.

Mayawati, president of the Bahujan Samaj Party and former Chief Minister of Uttar Pradesh, asserted that the Nyantam Aay Yojana was "just vote bank politics" of the Congress party. Abhijit Banerjee, the Ford Foundation International Professor of Economics at MIT criticised NYAY, asserting that "it will only be funded with high taxes and inflation".

Responses to Criticism 

In response to some of the aforementioned criticisms, the Hindu Business Line argued: "the scheme will require ₹3.6-lakh crore per year. It amounts to 1.9 per cent of the GDP. Now where this money come from? This should not be a big problem.

According to World-Bank and IMF estimates, India’s nominal income in 2018 was about ₹185 lakh crore ($2670 billion), and India was the seventh largest economy in the world. In this situation, 25 crore poorest people could legitimately claim 1.9 per cent as their share in the national income. If the Centre can spend more than ₹1 lakh crore on its 85 lakh employees (45 lakh in service and 40 lakh pension-holders) as per the Seventh Pay Commission’s recommendations; and if the same amount of money is spent towards oil subsidy to reduce the so-called losses of the oil-companies— why should 25 crore people not deserve ₹3.60-lakh crore or 1.9 per cent of the national income?" 

The Congress Party stated its goal was nothing less than the abolition of extreme Poverty in India: "The abolition of poverty remains the foremost goal of the Congress. We recall with pride that the Congress-led UPA government lifted 14 crore people out of poverty between 2004 and 2014.

It is true that rapid and broad-based growth will reduce poverty, and, in the medium to long term, eliminate poverty. On the other hand, decisive and focused intervention has the capacity to eliminate poverty within a decade. Congress, therefore, sets the goal of elimination of abject poverty by the year 2030." This mirrors the UN's Agenda 2030 while being specific to the Indian Nation.

Live Mint reported on the possibility that some other related schemes could be subsumed by NYAY: "The Congress has hinted at doing away with some subsidies, sharing the cost with the state governments and raising new taxes. The total food, fertilizer and oil subsidies in 2019-20 are expected to be at ₹2.97 trillion, or 1.41% of the GDP. The point is that if the government is carrying out an income transfer to citizens, are the subsidies and many other government programmes really required?"

Notes

Nyuntam is a Hindi word meaning "minimum", and is not to be confused with "NYAY" meaning justice.

References

Welfare in India
2019 Indian general election
Indian general election campaigns
Indian National Congress campaigns
Rahul Gandhi